Jessie Daams (born 28 May 1990) is a Belgian former racing cyclist. She competed in the 2013 UCI women's road race in Florence. Her father is the Dutch cyclist Hans Daams.

Major results

2008
 3rd  Road race, UEC European Junior Road Championships
 7th Time trial, UCI Juniors World Championships
2009
 2nd  Team pursuit, UEC European Under-23 Track Championships (with Kelly Druyts and Jolien D'Hoore)
 7th Holland Hills Classic
 9th Overall Tour Féminin en Limousin
2010
 1st  Team pursuit, UEC European Under-23 Track Championships (with Kelly Druyts and Jolien D'Hoore)
2011
 9th Road race, UEC European Under-23 Road Championships
2012
 3rd  Team time trial, UCI Road World Championships
 3rd Road race, National Road Championships
 6th Time trial, UEC European Under-23 Road Championships
 9th Overall Holland Ladies Tour
 10th Overall Thüringen Rundfahrt der Frauen
1st Stage 6
2013
 6th Gooik–Geraardsbergen–Gooik
 8th Holland Hills Classic
 9th Overall Giro del Trentino Alto Adige-Südtirol
 10th La Flèche Wallonne Féminine
2014
 7th Omloop van het Hageland
 8th Holland Hills Classic
 9th Overall Emakumeen Euskal Bira
 10th Trofee Maarten Wynants
2015
 1st Time trial, Limburg Provincial Road Championships
 6th Durango-Durango Emakumeen Saria
 10th Overall La Route de France
2016
 5th Durango-Durango Emakumeen Saria

See also
 2012 AA Drink-leontien.nl season
 2013 Boels Dolmans Cycling Team season
 2014 Boels Dolmans Cycling Team season

References

External links

1990 births
Living people
Belgian female cyclists
People from Neerpelt
Cyclists at the 2015 European Games
European Games competitors for Belgium
Cyclists from Limburg (Belgium)
Belgian people of Dutch descent
21st-century Belgian women